The Commissioners of Audit had responsibility from 1785 to 1866 for the auditing of public accounts in the United Kingdom.

History
In 1785 a Commission for Auditing the Public Accounts was established by statute, replacing the Auditors of the Imprest. Its members, the Commissioners of Audit, were five in number: three were appointed by letters patent, the other two were the Comptrollers of Army Accounts, who served ex officio. (Comptrollers of Army Accounts had first been appointed in 1703, to audit the accounts of all Army regiments and paymasters; their office was later abolished, in 1835, whereupon their duties were taken over by the Commissioners of Audit.) 

In 1806 the Commission was reconstituted with ten commissioners (no longer incorporating the ex officio members). Over ensuing decades the size of the Commission gradually decreased as departing members were not always replaced. Under the terms of the Exchequer and Audit Departments Act 1866, the offices of the Comptroller of the Exchequer and the Commissioners of Audit were merged and their duties vested in a new official: the Comptroller and Auditor General. His office, the Exchequer and Audit Department, was reconstituted in 1984 as the National Audit Office.

List of commissioners

References

1785 establishments in England
1866 disestablishments in England
Auditing in the United Kingdom